Gromshin Heights (‘Gromshinski Vazvisheniya’ \'grom-shin-ski v&-zvi-'she-ni-ya\) are the heights rising to 2731 m at Mount Ulmer on the east side of northern Sentinel Range in Ellsworth Mountains, Antarctica.  They extend 35 km in north–south direction and 20 km in east–west direction.  The feature is upturned U-shaped with its interior drained by the south flowing Vicha Glacier, and its northeast side marked by the extensive Miller Bluffs.  The heights are bounded by Rutford Ice Stream to the east and Newcomer Glacier to the south and west, and is connected to Mount Wyatt Earp on the northwest by Skamni Saddle, and to Mount Weems on the north by Kipra Gap. Their interior is drained by Vicha and Yamen Glaciers.

The heights are named after the settlement of Gromshin in Northwestern Bulgaria.

Location
US mapping in 1961.

See also
 Mountains in Antarctica

Geographical features include:

 Branishte Peak
 Foros Spur
 Kipra Gap
 Matsch Ridge
 Miller Bluffs
 Mount Cornwell
 Mount Mogensen
 Mount Ojakangas
 Mount Ulmer
 Mount Warren
 Mount Weems
 Newcomer Glacier
 Polarstar Peak
 Skamni Saddle
 Vicha Glacier
 Vidul Glacier
 Yamen Glacier

Maps
 Newcomer Glacier.  Scale 1:250 000 topographic map.  Reston, Virginia: US Geological Survey, 1961.
 Antarctic Digital Database (ADD). Scale 1:250000 topographic map of Antarctica. Scientific Committee on Antarctic Research (SCAR). Since 1993, regularly upgraded and updated.

Notes

References
 Gromshin Heights. SCAR Composite Gazetteer of Antarctica.
 Bulgarian Antarctic Gazetteer. Antarctic Place-names Commission. (details in Bulgarian, basic data in English)

External links
 Gromshin Heights. Copernix satellite image

Mountains of Ellsworth Land
Bulgaria and the Antarctic